The R149 road is a regional road in Ireland from Leixlip, County Kildare to Clonee, County Meath. It starts in Leixlip at the junction with the R148 at Main Street. It passes through Confey in Kildare; Passifyoucan and Barnhill in Fingal and Hilltown in Meath before ending in Clonee at the junction with the R156.

See also
Roads in Ireland
National primary road
National secondary road

References
Roads Act 1993 (Classification of Regional Roads) Order 2006 – Department of Transport

Regional roads in the Republic of Ireland
Roads in County Kildare
Roads in County Meath